The Croix de guerre 1914–1918 is a French military decoration, the first version of the Croix de Guerre.  It was created to recognize French and allied soldiers who were cited for valorous service during World War I, similar to the British mentioned in dispatches but with multiple degrees equivalent to other nations' decorations for courage.

Soon after the outbreak of World War I, French military officials felt that a new military award had to be created. At that time, the Citation du jour ("Daily Citation") already existed to acknowledge soldiers, but it was just a sheet of paper. Only the Médaille Militaire and Legion of Honour were bestowed for courage in the field, due to the numbers now involved, a new decoration was required in earnest.  At the end of 1914, General Boëlle, Commandant in Chief of the French 4th Army Corps, tried to convince the French administration to create a formal military award. Maurice Barrès, the noted writer and parliamentarian for Paris, gave Boëlle support in his efforts.

On 23 December 1914, the French parliamentarian Georges Bonnefous proposed a legislative bill to create the Croix de la Valeur Militaire ("Cross of Military Valour") signed by 66 other parliamentarians. Émile Driant, a parliamentarian who served in the war zone during much of this time, became its natural spokesman when he returned to the legislature. On 18 January 1915, Driant submitted this bill but the name of the military award was renamed to Croix de guerre ("War Cross"). After parliamentary discussions, the bill was adopted on 2 April 1915.

World War I began in 1914 and ended in 1918, so the final name adopted is "Croix de guerre 1914–1918".

Award statute 
Every Croix de guerre awarded carries at least one citation for gallantry or courage to a member of any rank of the French military or of an allied army. Ribbon devices indicate the importance or degree of the soldier's role during the action cited. The lowest degree is represented by a bronze star and the highest degree is represented by a bronze palm. The cross is only awarded once and subsequent actions worthy of citations will be limited to additional ribbon devices on the originally received insignia.  The number of ribbon devices on a Croix de guerre is not limited, some awards, especially to ace fighter pilots, had extremely long ribbons with dozens of stars and palms.

The Croix de guerre 1914-1918 was attributed to:
French and allied soldiers individually cited for a wartime act of gallantry;
Civilians and militarized personnel individually cited for a wartime act of gallantry;
Automatically to soldiers and civilians not specifically cited for a Croix de guerre but awarded the Légion d'honneur or Médaille militaire for the highest acts of wartime valour and gazetted in the Official Journal of the French Republic;
Collectively, to army units, ships or air squadrons;
To cities and villages, martyrs of war, destroyed, ravaged or bombed by the enemy (2952 towns received the Croix de guerre 1914–1918, in this case, always awarded with palm).

Soldiers who were/are members of units recognized by a collective unit award of the Croix de guerre may wear the Fourragère of the Croix de guerre 1914-1918 as long as they remain members of that unit.  Soldiers who actively took part as members of units during repeated feats of arms recognized by more than one collective award of the Croix de guerre may continue to wear the fourragère even after leaving the meritorious unit.  Battle streamers in the colours of the Croix de guerre 1914-1918 are affixed to the colours of recipient units.

Award description 
The cross was designed by the sculptor Paul-Albert Bartholomé. It is 37 mm wide, Florentine bronze cross pattée, with two crossed swords pointing up between the arms. The obverse centre medallion bears the relief image of the French Republic in the form of the bust of a young woman wearing a Phrygian cap surrounded by the circular relief inscription RÉPUBLIQUE FRANCAISE (FRENCH REPUBLIC).  Not knowing how long the war would last, the reverse centre medallion bears the dates 1914–1915, 1914–1916, 1914–1917 and finally 1914–1918.

The cross is suspended by a ring through a suspension loop cast atop the upper cross arm.  It hangs from a 37 mm wide green silk moiré ribbon with seven narrow 1,5 mm wide vertical red stripes evenly spaced and two 1 mm red edge stripes.

The lowest degree is represented by a bronze star and the highest degree is represented by a silver palm.  The cross was worn with the appropriate attachments to signify the singular or multiple awards of the decoration.

 Bronze star (étoile de bronze): for those who were mentioned at the regiment,  battalion or brigade level.
 Silver star (étoile d'argent): for those who were cited at the division level.
 Silver gilt star (étoile vermeil): for those who were cited at the corps level.
 Bronze palm (palme de bronze): for those who were cited at the army level.
 Silver palm (palme d'argent): could be worn in lieu of five bronze palms.

Notable French recipients (partial list) 

General Charles de Gaulle (1 citation)
Fighter ace lieutenant Charles Nungesser (30 citations)
Fighter ace captain Georges Guynemer (26 citations)
General Edgard de Larminat (4 citations)
General Joseph de Goislard de Monsabert (7 citations)
Colonel Théophile Marie Brébant (4 citations)
General Jean Vallette d'Osia (6 citations)
General Raoul Salan (1 citation)
Fighter ace colonel René Fonck (29 citations)
General Marie-Pierre Kœnig (2 citations)
General Raoul Magrin-Vernerey (11 citations)
Fighter ace lieutenant-colonel Charles Nuville (10 citations)
Fighter ace captain Georges Madon (10 citations)
Marshal Joseph Joffre (1 citation)
General Robert Nivelle (3 citations)

Notable foreign recipients (partial list) 
Brigadier General John William Barker 
Fighter ace Air Marshal William Avery "Billy" Bishop V.C. 
Field Marshal Petar Bojović 
Lieutenant General Lewis H. Brereton 
Major General Charles Budworth 
Corporal Eugene Bullard, French Air Force 
Fighter ace Captain Vernon Castle 
Carrier Pigeon Cher Ami, Lost Battalion (World War I) 
Fighter ace Air Vice Marshal Raymond Collishaw 
General Sir Arthur William Currie 
Fighter ace major Roderic Dallas 
Private Herman Davis 
Brigadier General Edward Terence Donnelly 
Brigadier General Lucius Loyd Durfee 
Field Marshal John French, 1st Earl of Ypres 
Director General Stephen Galatti, American Field Service 
Lt William F. Howe, 2nd Battle of Marne - w Gold Star 
Brigadier General Evan M. Johnson 
Sergeant Henry Johnson 
Sergeant George Lawson Keene 
Fighter ace captain Robert A. Little 
General Douglas MacArthur 
Lieutenant Giuseppe Franchi Maggi, Royal Italian Army 
General George C. Marshall 
Fighter ace major James McCudden 
Corporal Harry Miner V.C. 
Field Marshal Živojin Mišić 
Air Chief Marshal Sir Keith Rodney Park 
General George S. Patton 
Sergeant John Ranner 282nd Brigade, Royal Field Artillery 
Captain Eddie Rickenbacker 
Private Needham Roberts 
Lt Quentin Roosevelt 
General Sir Archibald Paris 
Philanthropist Julia Hunt Catlin Park DePew Taufflieb 
Lieutenant Stephen W. Thompson, Lafayette Escadrille 
Sergeant First Class Wilson H Williams (Red) 227th Aero Squadron  Toul Sector 
Sergeant Alvin C. York

French recipient units (partial list) 
1st Infantry Regiment
54th Infantry Regiment
126th Infantry Regiment
2nd Battalions of Light Infantry of Africa
1st Cuirassier Regiment
12th Cuirassier Regiment
6th Dragoon Regiment
9th Hussar Regiment
1st Artillery Regiment
2nd Dragoon Regiment
1st Moroccan Division
French battleship Bouvet
French battleship Gaulois
French submarine Bernouilli
Lafayette Escadrille

Allied recipient units (partial list) 
Portuguese Expeditionary Corps 15th Infantry Battalion 
Russian Expeditionary Force Russian Legion Battalion 
The Black Watch 
Devonshire Regiment  
5th Battery R.F.A.  
2nd Motorized Field Ambulance 
24th Field Ambulance  
5th Field Artillery Regiment 
2nd Infantry Division 
15th Field Artillery Regiment 
3rd Infantry Division 
4th Infantry Division 
16th Infantry Division 
26th Infantry Division 
32nd Infantry Division 
119th Field Artillery Regiment 
93rd Infantry Division 
39th Infantry Regiment 
104th Infantry Regiment 
369th Infantry Regiment 
370th Infantry Regiment 
5th Marine Regiment 
6th Marine Regiment

Recipient cities (partial list) 
Reims
Paris
Dinant 
Montdidier
Calais
Épernay
Lille
Nancy
Amiens

See also 

Ribbons of the French military and civil awards
Croix de guerre 1939–1945
Croix de Guerre des Théatres d'Opérations Exterieures
Croix de Guerre (Belgium)

References

External links 

 France Phaléristique 
Museum of the Legion of Honour 

1915 establishments in France
Awards established in 1915
Courage awards
Military awards and decorations of France
Military awards and decorations of World War I
France in World War I
Recipients of the Croix de Guerre 1914–1918 (France)